New Holland-Middletown Elementary School District 88 (NH-M) is an elementary and middle school district headquartered in Middletown, Illinois. It serves Middletown and New Holland.

The high school for students assigned to District 88 schools is Lincoln Community High School.

References

External links
 

Education in Logan County, Illinois
School districts in Illinois